Henry James Hopkins  (11 August 1912 – 9 January 1986) was a New Zealand civil engineer and university professor. He was born in Dwellingup, Western Australia, Australia on 11 August 1912.

In the 1980 New Year Honours, Hopkins was appointed an Officer of the Order of the British Empire.

References

1912 births
1986 deaths
New Zealand academics
People from Dwellingup, Western Australia
Australian emigrants to New Zealand
New Zealand Officers of the Order of the British Empire
20th-century New Zealand engineers
New Zealand civil engineers